Maderno can refer to:

Carlo Maderno, Italian 17th-century architect
Stefano Maderno, Italian 17th-century sculptor
Maderno, a town in the comune of Toscolano-Maderno, Lombardy, Italy
Cesano Maderno, a comune in the province of Milan, Lombardy, Italy